Turkey (listed as TUR) participated in the 4th  World Women’s Boxing Championship held between November 18 and 23, 2006 in New Delhi, India. With twelve women boxers participating, Turkey garnered two medals, one gold and one bronze. It ranked 5th in the unofficial medal table.

Participants
 46 kg - Derya Aktop, Ankara (TSE)
 48 kg - Gülseda Başıbütün, Ankara
 50 kg - Hasibe Erkoç, Ankara (TSE)
 52 kg - Sümeyra Kaya, İstanbul (Fenerbahçe)
 54 kg - Sabriye Şengül, Trabzon
 57 kg - Nagehan Gül, Kocaeli
 63 kg - Perihan Vurkan, Çankırı
 66 kg - Yeliz Yeşil, Ordu
 70 kg - Nurcan Çarkçı, İstanbul
 75 kg - Hatice Aliç, İzmir
 80 kg - Selma Yağcı, Denizli
 86 kg - Şemsi Yaralı, Ankara (TSE)
Technical director: Selahattin Başaran, Ankara

Medals

Results by event

Abbreviations
 SF Semi-finals
 F Finals

External links
 Super Spor 
 NTV Spor 
 Arama Net 
 Haber-Yorum 
 
Women's World Boxing Championships
2006 World Women's Boxing Championship
2006 in Turkish sport
2006 in Turkish women's sport